Technological University (Kalay) is a technological university under the Ministry of Science and Technology. It is situated in the Tharyarwady village, south of the Kalay, Sagaing Region, Myanmar.It was established as Government Technical Institute on 1999. Then it was changed into Government Technological College on 2001 and upgraded into University on 2007.

Departments 
 Civil Engineering Department
 Electronic and Communication Department
 Electrical Power Engineering Department
 Mechanical Engineering Department

Programs 
The university offered Bachelor of Engineering and Bachelor of Technology till 2017. From 2018, the university offers only Bachelor of Engineering.

See also 
 Technological University, Monywa
 Technological University Sagaing
 List of Technological Universities in Myanmar

References

External links
 

Technological universities in Myanmar
Universities and colleges in Sagaing Region